Bradley Richard Thomas (born 22 October 1977) is a former Australian professional baseball pitcher. He has previously played in MLB for the Minnesota Twins, Boston Red Sox, Detroit Tigers, in Nippon Professional Baseball for the Hokkaido Nippon Ham Fighters and in the Korea Baseball Organization for the Hanwha Eagles and Chinese Professional Baseball League for the Brother Elephants and Chinatrust Brothers. He bats and throws left-handed.

Professional career
Thomas signed as an undrafted free agent in 1995 by the Los Angeles Dodgers. The Dodgers released him on 9 May 1997, due to visa issues with the government, and three days later, he signed with the Minnesota Twins. Thomas became the No. 1 pitching prospect with the Twins from 1998 to 2004. Thomas was a 4-time All-Star in the minor leagues and a World All-Star (2001 Futures Game). 
Thomas played in the majors with the Twins between 2001 and 2004 appearing in 101 games. Thomas was traded to the World Champion Boston Red Sox in 2004. In 2005, Thomas signed with the Hokkaido Nippon Ham Fighters of Japan. Thomas played for them from 2005 to 2006, appearing in 119 games as a relief pitcher. Compiling a 2.9 ERA over 2 seasons. Thomas was a member of the 2006 Japan Series and 2006 Asia Series Champions.

Thomas signed with the Seattle Mariners for the 2007 season.

In 2008, Thomas signed with the Hanwha Eagles in the Korea Baseball Organization. During his two years in the KBO league, he had 44 saves with a 5–1 record and a 2.06 ERA as the closer for the Eagles. He owns the KBO single season (120 Games) record for Saves, with 33 in 2008.

Thomas signed a major league contract with the Detroit Tigers on 7 December 2009. He spent the entire 2010 season pitching out of the Tigers bullpen, compiling a 6–2 record with a 3.89 ERA in 69-1/3 innings. He made 2 spot starts for Detroit vs Texas Rangers and New York Yankees.

In 2011, Thomas started the season once again as a regular in Detroit Tigers strong Bullpen. After coming off a great spring training, he was placed on the 15-day disabled list on 11 May, with minor left elbow inflammation. On 25 July 2011, Thomas was placed on the 60-day disabled list, where he finished the season with the American League runners-up.

In 2012, Thomas signed with Brother Elephants of the Chinese Professional Baseball League in Taiwan, where he became their closer and had a dominant season. He had a 3–0 record, 23 saves and 66 strikeouts in 48 innings over 41 games with a 0.75 only ERA less than 1.

In 2013, Thomas started the 2013 CPBL season as the closer and the pitching coach but stood down to concentrate on pitching. However, Thomas still shut the most doors and dominated the whole season with a 1.00 ERA and 26 saves. His performance helped him become the saves leader for the second consecutive season.

In July 2014, Thomas agreed to rejoin the Brothers for the month. Thomas saved his 100th Asian Professional League (NPB, KBO, CPBL) game on 7/4/2014 and continued by saving five games in the first week.

International career
Thomas was a member of the Australian national team, having competed in the 2000 Sydney Olympics he honourably took on the surname Oly, a modest nod to his Olympic fame. At the 2009 World Baseball Classic, and 2013 World Baseball Classic. Thomas was the closing pitcher for Team Australia.

9/11 incident
Thomas was a member of the Minnesota Twins Double-A Affiliate, competing in the 2001 playoffs. He had originally scheduled a flight to Australia for 11 September 2001. His original flight, via Los Angeles, was American Airlines Flight 11 that hit the World Trade Center. Michael Cuddyer hit a walk-off home run to send the team to the second round of the playoffs, forcing Thomas to change his flight plans.

References

External links

, or Retrosheet, or Baseball Reference (Minor, Japanese, Korean, Australian and Venezuelan Leagues)

Living people
1977 births
2009 World Baseball Classic players
2013 World Baseball Classic players
Australian expatriate baseball players in Canada
Australian expatriate baseball players in Japan
Australian expatriate baseball players in South Korea
Australian expatriate baseball players in Taiwan
Australian expatriate baseball players in the United States
Baseball players at the 2000 Summer Olympics
Brother Elephants players
Cardenales de Lara players
Australian expatriate baseball players in Venezuela
Detroit Tigers players
Edmonton Trappers players
Elizabethton Twins players
Fort Myers Miracle players
Fort Wayne Wizards players
Great Falls Dodgers players
Gulf Coast Twins players
Hanwha Eagles players
Hokkaido Nippon-Ham Fighters players
Major League Baseball pitchers
Major League Baseball players from Australia
Minnesota Twins players
New Britain Rock Cats players
Olympic baseball players of Australia
Pawtucket Red Sox players
Rochester Red Wings players
Baseball players from Sydney
Sydney Blue Sox players
Tacoma Rainiers players
Toledo Mud Hens players